The 1905–06 Dartmouth men's ice hockey season was the inaugural season of play for the program.

Season
Joining in with the majority of other future Ivy League teams, Darthmouth began playing ice hockey with the 1905–06 season. The genesis of the team was a result of the efforts of four students from the Cambridge area: Addison Brooks, Eugene Brooks, John Crocker and Warren Foote. All four would eventually serve as captain for the team.

Note: Dartmouth College did not possess a moniker for its athletic teams until the 1920s, however, the university had adopted 'Dartmouth Green' as its school color in 1866.

Roster

Standings

Schedule and Results

|-
!colspan=12 style=";" | Regular Season

References

Dartmouth Big Green men's ice hockey seasons
Dartmouth
Dartmouth
Dartmouth
Dartmouth